Elias Holl (28 February 1573 in Augsburg – 6 January 1646 in Augsburg) 
was the most important architect of late German Renaissance architecture.

Life
Elias Holl was born in Augsburg, Werbhausgasse 2. He was descended from a master-builder-Family. His father Hans Holl (1512-1594) taught him. In 1596 he passed the exam, the Meisterprüfung. After an abidance in Tyrol and Italy in the years 1600/1601 – he visited Bozen and Venice – in 1602 he became Werkmeister of Augsburg. In 1629 he lost his office as Stadtbaumeister because he was a protestant. Since then he was only called Stadtgeometer. He was dismissed from office in 1631. He is buried in the Augsburg Protestant Cemetery.

Building
He was the architect and constructor of Augsburg's landmark: the Augsburg Town Hall.
More buildings in Augsburg are Zeughaus (1602-1607), Wertachbrucker Tor (1605) Stadtmetzg (1609), St.-Anna-Gymnasium (1613), addition of the Perlachturm (1614-1616) and the Heilig-Geist-Spital (1626-1631) (it contains the Augsburger Puppenkiste)

References

External links

 Elias Holl on augsburg.de

People from Augsburg
1573 births
1646 deaths
16th-century German architects
17th-century German architects
Bavarian architects